Fremont Speedway, also known as "The Track That Action Built" and "Home of the All Stars", is a semi-banked 1/3 mile clay oval speedway located at the Sandusky County Fairgrounds in Fremont, Ohio, United States. Races are typically held on Saturday nights. Regular events include 410 cubic inch sprint cars, 305 cubic inch sprint cars, and dirt trucks. The speedway also is hosting the American Late Model Series, and new for the 2012 season, is a Run What You Brung. The speedway has previously hosted the National Sprint Tour, and United States Auto Club, and World of Outlaws.

Track records

History
The first automobile race was held at the Sandusky County Fairgrounds on Sunday, June 7, 1936 when the International Speedway Association leased the half-mile horse track for a Big Cars race. Big Cars, as they were known, were the forerunners to today's sprint cars. An estimated 7,000 people attended the first race as Clay Corbitt picked up the feature win. Despite the success of the first race, it would be 12 years before Fremont hosted another auto race. On September 19, 1948, the Tri-State Racing Association leased the fairgrounds for a racing program billed as the Tri-State Racing Association's Championship. Over 4,000 fans were in attendance to watch Red Bales win the feature event. 

In the fall of 1951, Joe and Dorothy Stelter and Harry Maynor of Toledo, Ohio founded Fremont Speedway. Their original track was just over 1/10 of a mile in length and nearly flat. On September 30, 1951, a crowd of 1,500 attended Fremont Speedway’s first official race. 38 drivers took part in the 20 lap feature event, which was won by Leo Caldwell of Perrysburg.

In 1952, Maynor sold his interest in the speedway to Frank Jensen of Toledo, and Wayne Wall of Toledo purchased an interest in 1953. Wall sold out in 1954 and the Stelters and Jensen operated the track until 1957 when a local Fremont businessman, Don Emick, purchased Jensen's stock. This operation continued until 1960 when Emick sold out, leaving Joe and Dot as the sole owners. After Joe's sudden death in 1962, Dot decided to continue and became one of the first female promoters in the country. Dot later married Paul Szakovits and he helped to operate the track. Dot promoted the speedway until 1976 when longtime announcer Gary Kern purchased the facility.

During the 1990s, the facility changed hands many times. In 1994 Joseph Darr became a partner with Kern. Delphos, Ohio resident Ken Langhals operated the speedway in 1995. In 1996 Kelly Applegate purchased the speedway, followed by Ken Meggitt in 1997. The track then sat idle for two years  until Jim Ford, a former driver and sprint car owner from Elmore, Ohio, leased the track from the Sandusky County Fair Board. Ford reopened the track in 2000 with many improvements. In 2007, Ford stepped down as promoter due to health issues. The fair board elected Rich Farmer and Andy James as co-promoters of the speedway in 2008. In 2010, Emods competed at the speedway for the first time ever.

The speedway has become a pioneer in dirt track racing over the years. It was one of the first tracks in the nation to run the now popular 305 sprint car division. In 2000, Jim Ford created the dirt truck division as an affordable entry level into dirt track racing. Similar divisions have since spread across the nation. The speedway was also the first dirt track in the nation to incorporate soft wall technology.

The speedway has hosted many nationally renowned race car drivers including Steve Kinser, Sammy Swindell, Jeff Gordon, Dave Blaney, Kasey Kahne, Brad Doty, and Doug Wolfgang. "The Ohio Traveler" Rick Ferkel began his storied career with a victory at the speedway. The speedway has also hosted nearly 100 All Star Circuit of Champions events, earning it the nickname "Home of the All Stars."

Hall of Fame
The following people have been inducted in Fremont Speedway's Hall of Fame.

Racers with three or more Championships (Active Divisions)
410 Sprint Cars/Super Sprint: 8 Championships; Mark Keegan. 5 Championships; Jim Linder. 4 Championships; Gug Keegan and Al Franks. 3 Championships; John Ivy and Byron Reed

305 Sprint Cars: 3 Championships; Bryan Scott and Stuart Brubaker

Dirt Trucks: 4 Championships; Steve Sabo

All-time win list
The following drivers sit at the top ten of Fremont Speedway's all-time feature win list (as of April 5, 2012).

References

External links
Fremont Speedway

Dirt oval race tracks in the United States
Motorsport venues in Ohio
Buildings and structures in Fremont, Ohio
Tourist attractions in Sandusky County, Ohio